Chaenostoma is a genus of flowering plants belonging to the family Scrophulariaceae.

Its native range is Southern Tropical and Southern Africa.

Species:

Chaenostoma aethiopicum 
Chaenostoma affine 
Chaenostoma archeri 
Chaenostoma caeruleum 
Chaenostoma calciphilum 
Chaenostoma calycinum 
Chaenostoma campanulatum 
Chaenostoma cinereum 
Chaenostoma comptonii 
Chaenostoma cordatum 
Chaenostoma debile 
Chaenostoma decipiens 
Chaenostoma denudatum 
Chaenostoma floribundum 
Chaenostoma glabratum 
Chaenostoma glanduliferum 
Chaenostoma halimifolium 
Chaenostoma hispidum 
Chaenostoma impeditum 
Chaenostoma integrifolium 
Chaenostoma langebergense 
Chaenostoma leve 
Chaenostoma longipedicellatum 
Chaenostoma macrosiphon 
Chaenostoma marifolium 
Chaenostoma multiramosum 
Chaenostoma neglectum 
Chaenostoma paniculatum 
Chaenostoma patrioticum 
Chaenostoma pauciflorum 
Chaenostoma placidum 
Chaenostoma platysepalum 
Chaenostoma polelense 
Chaenostoma polyanthum 
Chaenostoma racemosum 
Chaenostoma revolutum 
Chaenostoma roseoflavum 
Chaenostoma rotundifolium 
Chaenostoma septentrionale 
Chaenostoma subnudum 
Chaenostoma subsessile 
Chaenostoma subspicatum 
Chaenostoma tenuicaule 
Chaenostoma titanophilum 
Chaenostoma uncinatum 
Chaenostoma violaceum

References

Scrophulariaceae
Scrophulariaceae genera